Maurice Benn (born 9 November 1946) is a British middle-distance runner. He competed in the men's 1500 metres at the 1968 Summer Olympics.

References

1946 births
Living people
Athletes (track and field) at the 1968 Summer Olympics
British male middle-distance runners
Olympic athletes of Great Britain
Place of birth missing (living people)